Rwanda Development Gateway (RDG)  is a project of the Government of Rwanda run under the National University of Rwanda (NUR). The RDG is implementing a Program to set up a National Portal as platform for information sharing. The Portal represents a one-stop-shop for information on   Rwanda   and the country’s web interface to the rest of the world.

The RDG aims at poverty reduction by providing opportunities for knowledge sharing and networking among communities to drive the development agenda in a participatory way, basing on local priorities. This is in line with the Vision 2020 and the National Information and Communications Infrastructure (NICI) Plans.

Communications in Rwanda